This is a list of former sports teams from the US state of Texas:

Baseball

Major leagues

Negro leagues

Austin Black Senators (early 1910s)
Abilene Eagles
Cleburne Yellow Jackets
Dallas Black Giants
Dallas Brown Bombers
Dallas Green Monarchs
Fort Worth Black Cats
Fort Worth Black Panthers
Fort Worth Giants
Fort Worth Wonders
Galveston Flyaways
Houston Black Buffaloes
Houston Eagles 
Jasper Steers
Mineola Black Spiders
Paris Giants
San Angelo Black Sheep Herders
San Antonio Black Bronchos 
San Antonio Black Indians
San Antonio Bombers
Waco Black Cardinals
Waco Black Navigators
Waco Yellowjackets
Waco Tigers
Wichita Falls Black Spudders

Minor leagues

American Association (20th century)
Houston Buffaloes (1959–1961)

American Association of Independent Professional Baseball
Coastal Bend Aviators (2003–2007)

Big State League
Abilene Blue Sox (1956–1957), moved from West Texas–New Mexico League
Austin Pioneers (1947–1955) 
Beaumont Exporters or Beaumont Shippers (1956); Beaumont Pirates (1957) 
Bryan Majors (1953); Bryan Indians (1954) 
Corpus Christi Clippers (1954–1957) 
Del Rio Indians (1954) 
Gainesville Owls (1947–1951) 
Galveston White Caps (1954–1955), moved from Gulf Coast League 
Greenville Majors (1947–1950), moved from East Texas League (1946); Greenville Majors (1953) 
Harlingen Capitals (1954–1955), moved from Gulf Coast League (1951–1953) and Rio Grande Valley League (1950)
Longview Cherokees (1952–1953)
Lubbock Hubbers (1956), moved from West Texas–New Mexico League  
Paris Red Peppers (1947), moved from East Texas League (1946); Paris Panthers (1948); Paris Indians (1952–1953) 
Port Arthur Sea Hawks (1955–1956), moved from Evangeline League (1954) and Gulf Coast League (1950–1953); Port Arthur Redlegs (1957) 
Sherman-Denison Twins (1947–1951) 
Temple Eagles (1949–1954); Temple Redlegs (1957) 
Texarkana Bears (1947–1953), moved from East Texas League (1946)
Texas City Hubbers (1955); Texas City Exporters (1956) 
Tyler East Texans (1951–1953); Tyler Tigers (1954–1955) 
Victoria Eagles (1956); Victoria Rosebuds (1957), moved to Texas League (1958–1961) 
Waco Dons (1947); Waco Pirates (1948–1953), (1954–1956) 
Wichita Falls Spudders 1947–1953, moved to Longhorn League (1954); Wichita Falls Spudders (1956–1957)

Central Baseball League
Abilene Prairie Dogs (1995–1999)
Coastal Bend Aviators (2003–2007)
Corpus Christi Barracudas 
Lubbock Crickets (?-1995) 
Rio Grande Valley WhiteWings (1994–2003, 2006–2007) now Harlingen WhiteWings (2008–present)
San Antonio Tejanos (1995) 
Tyler Wildcatters (1994–1997)

Continental Baseball League
Texas Heat (2007)

Mexican League
Tecolotes de los Dos Laredos (Owls of the Two Laredos) (1940–1984); renamed Tecolotes de Nuevo Laredo (1985–present)

Texas Association (Class-C)
First stage: 1896/second stage:1923–1926

Teams/years

Texas League
Alexandria Aces 
Amarillo Giants 
Amarillo Gold Sox (1939–1982)
Amarillo Sonics 
Ardmore Rosebuds 
Ardmore Territorians 
Austin Braves 
Austin Senators 
Beaumont Exporters (1920–49) and (1953–55)
Beaumont Golden Gators (1983–1986)
Beaumont Millionaires 
Beaumont Oil Gushers 
Beaumont Oilers 
Brenham Orphans 
Cleburne Railroaders (1906–1907)
Corpus Christi Giants 
Corsicana Oil Citys 
Corsicana Oilers 
Dallas Eagles (1958–1964)
Dallas Giants (1958–1964), under name Dallas Rangers
Dallas Griffins 
Dallas Marines 
Dallas Rangers (1958–1964)
Dallas Rebels (1958–1964), under name Dallas Rangers
Dallas Steers (1958–1964), under name Dallas Rangers
Dallas Submarines 
Dallas-Fort Worth Spurs (1965–1971)
El Paso Dodgers 
El Paso Sun Kings 
Fort Worth Cats (1958–1964), under name Dallas Rangers
Fort Worth Panthers (1958–1964), under name Dallas Rangers
Galveston Buccaneers 
Galveston Crabs 
Galveston Pirates 
Galveston Sand Crabs 
Houston Buffaloes (1907–1958)
Houston Wanderers 
Longview Cannibals 
Midland Angels (1985–1998), now Midland RockHounds
Midland Cubs (1972–1984), now Midland RockHounds
Paris Eisenfelder's Homeseekers 
Paris Parisites 
Rio Grande Valley Giants (1960–1961)
San Antonio Bears 
San Antonio Brewers 
San Antonio Bronchos 
San Antonio Bullets 
San Antonio Dodgers (1977–1987), now San Antonio Missions
San Antonio Indians  
The San Antonio Missions were AA Team that moved to Amarillo in 2018 and renamed Sod Poodles
Sherman-Denison Students  
Texarkana Casketmakers 
Tyler Sports 
Victoria Rosebuds (1959–1961)
Victoria Toros 
Waco Cubs 
Waco Navigators 
Waco Steers 
Waco Tigers 
Wichita Falls Spudders (1920–1957)
Wichita Pilots  (1989–2007), became Wichita Wranglers in 1989
Wichita Wranglers (1989–2007)

Texas–Louisiana League
Laredo Apaches (1940–1995)
Beaumont Bullfrogs (1994)

West Texas–New Mexico League

Abilene Apaches (1939); became Abilene Blue Sox (1946–1955)
Amarillo Gold Sox (1939–1942); Amarillo Gold Sox (1946–1955), moved to Western League 1956–1958 
Big Spring Barons 1938–1940; Big Spring Bombers (1941); Big Spring Pirates (1942)
Borger Gassers (1939–1942, 1946–1954)
El Paso Texans (1955), moved to Southwestern League 1956–1957, moved from Arizona–Texas League 1952–1954
Lamesa Lobos (1939–1941); Lamesa Dodgers (1942); Lamesa Lobos (1946–1952)
Lubbock Hubbers (1938–1942), (1946–1955), moved to Big State League (1956–1958)
Midland Cardinals (1937–1938); Midland Cowboys (1939–1940)
Monahans Trojans (1937)
Odessa Oilers (1937); Odessa Oilers (1940)
Pampa Oilers (1939–1942), (1946–1955), moved to Southwestern League (1956–1957)
Plainview Ponies (1953–1955), moved to Southwestern League (1956–1957)
Wichita Falls Spudders (1941–1942)
Wink Spudders (1937–1938)

Basketball

Men's

American Basketball Association
Dallas Chaparrals (1967–1973), became the San Antonio Spurs
Houston Mavericks (1967–1969)

Continental Basketball Association
Wichita Falls Texans (1988–1994)

Women's

National Women's Basketball League
Houston Stealth (2002–2004)

Women's National Basketball Association
San Antonio Stars (2003−2017)
Houston Comets  (1997–2008)

Cricket

Pro Cricket
Texas Arrow Heads (2004)

Football

Major football leagues

American Football League–National Football League
Houston Oilers (1960–1996), became the Tennessee Oilers (1997–1998), then renamed the Tennessee Titans
Dallas Texans (1952)
Dallas Texans (1960–1962), became the Kansas City Chiefs

Canadian Football League
San Antonio Texans (1995)

Spring Football League
Houston Marshals (2000)
San Antonio Matadors (2000)

United States Football League
Houston Gamblers (1984–1985)
San Antonio Gunslingers (1984–1985)

World Football League
San Antonio Wings (1975)
Houston Texans (1974–1975)

World League of American Football
San Antonio Riders (1991–1992)

Arena-indoor football

American Professional Football League
Conroe Storm (2007-2008)
Texas Thunder (2004)
Wichita Falls Diablos (2008)

Arena Football League
Austin Wranglers (2004–2007)
Dallas Desperados (2002-2008)
Dallas Texans (1990–1993)
Fort Worth Cavalry (1994)
Houston Thunderbears (1996–2001)
San Antonio Force (1992)
San Antonio Talons (2012–2014)
Texas Terror (1996–1997)

Alliance of American Football  AFL
 San Antonio Commanders (2019)

AF2
Laredo Law

Champions Indoor Football
San Angelo Bandits (2015–2016)

Indoor Professional Football League
Texas Terminators (1999)

Intense Football League

El Paso Rumble (2004)
Laredo Lobos (2006–2007)
Lubbock Lone Stars (2004–2005)

National Indoor Football League
Beaumont Drillers (2003–2008)
Fort Worth Sixers (2007)
Houston Wild Riders (2007)
Lubbock Gunslingers (2004–2005)
San Antonio Steers (2007)
Waco Marshals (2004)
Wichita Falls Thunder (2004)

Professional Indoor Football League
Texas Bullets (1998)

Women's Professional Football League
Austin Rage (2003)
Tulsa Black Widows (2006)

Hockey

Ice hockey

American Hockey League
Houston Aeros (1994–2013)
San Antonio Rampage 2002-2020 - Team moved to Las Vegas for the 2020-2021 season

American Hockey Association (1926–1942)
Dallas Texans (1941–1945)
Fort Worth Rangers (1941–1945)

Central Hockey League
Includes teams that began in the WPHL before the merger in 2001.
Amarillo Gorillas/Rattlers (1996–2010)
Austin Ice Bats (1996–2008)
Border City Bandits (Texarkana, Texas, 2000–2001)
Corpus Christi IceRays (1998–2010)
Dallas Freeze (1992–1995)
El Paso Buzzards (1996–2003)
Fort Worth Brahmas (1997–2013)
Fort Worth Fire (1992–1999)
Laredo Bucks (2002–2012)
Lubbock Cotton Kings (1999–2007)
Odessa Jackalopes (1997–2011)
Rio Grande Valley Killer Bees (2003–2012)
San Angelo Saints/Outlaws (1997–2005)
San Antonio Iguanas (1994–1997, 1998–2002)

Central Hockey League (1963–1984)
Amarillo Wranglers (1968–1969, 1970–1971)
Dallas Black Hawks (1967–1981)
Fort Worth Texans (1974–1982)
Fort Worth Wings (1967–1974)
Houston Apollos (1965–1969)

Southwest Hockey League (1975–1977)
Amarillo Wranglers (1975–1977)

United States Hockey League
Dallas Texans (1945–46, 1948–49)
Fort Worth Rangers (1945–49)
Houston Huskies (1947–1949)
Houston Skippers (1946–47)

Western Professional Hockey League
Teams that did not join the CHL in 2001:
Central Texas Stampede (1996–2001)
Lake Charles Ice Pirates (1997–2001)
Waco Wizards (1996–2000)

World Hockey Association
Houston Aeros (1972–1978)

Roller hockey

Roller Hockey International
Austin Chiles (1999)
Dallas Stallions (1999)

Soccer

Men's

Continental Indoor Soccer League
Dallas Sidekicks (1983–2004)
Houston Hotshots (1993–2000)

Lone Star Soccer Alliance
Austin Thunder (1987–92)
Dallas Inter (1987–92), as Dallas Express in 1987, as Dallas Mean Green in 1988, as F.C. Dallas in 1989–91
Houston Alianza (1988–91)
Houston Dynamos–Houston International (1987–1991)
Houston Summit (1978–1980)
San Antonio Alamo (1987–90, as San Antonio International in 1987–89)
San Antonio XLR8 (1992)
Wichita Falls Fever (1989–92)

North American Soccer League
Dallas Tornado (1967–1981)
Houston Hurricane (1978–1980)
Houston Stars (1968)

United Soccer Leagues
Amarillo Challengers
Austin Lightning (2002–2007)
Austin Lone Stars (1987–2000)
Dallas Americans (1984–85)
Dallas Lightning (1993–1996); originally Tyler Lightning, then Texas Lightning 
Dallas Rockets (1991–1992)
El Paso/Juarez Gamecocks (1985)
Houston Dynamos (1984)
Houston Express (1988–1990)
Houston Force (1995)
San Antonio Scorpions (2011–2015)

Women's

Women's Premier Soccer League
Houston Stars

Team tennis

World TeamTennis
Austin Aces (2014–2015; relocated to become the Orange County Breakers)
Houston E-Z Riders (1974)
Houston Astro-Knots (1982–1983)
Houston Wranglers (2005–2007)
Texas Wild (2013–2014; relocated to become the California Dream and then folded after the 2015 season)
Dallas Stars (1982–1983)
 San Antonio Racquets (1985-1994)

Lacrosse

Major League Lacrosse
Dallas Rattlers (2017-2020)

See also
 List of defunct Florida sports teams
 List of defunct Georgia sports teams
 List of defunct Idaho sports teams
 List of defunct Mississippi sports teams
 List of defunct Ohio sports teams
 List of defunct Pennsylvania sports teams
 Sports in San Antonio

Sources 
"Texas Almanac 2008–2009", The Dallas Morning News, c.2008

References

 
Texas
Defunct